Chibilya (Çibilü) is a rural locality (a selo) and the administrative centre of Yaboganskoye Rural Settlement of Ulagansky District, the Altai Republic, Russia. The population was 699 as of 2016. There are 7 streets.

Geography 
Chibilya is located 3 km southwest of Ulagan (the district's administrative centre) by road. Ulagan is the nearest rural locality.

References 

Rural localities in Ulagansky District